The Arapey Grande River is a river in the Salto Department of northwestern Uruguay. It flows from the northeast of department, with its headwaters near the border with Rivera Department, in a western direction and discharges in the Uruguay River. All of its tributaries are streams within Salto department, with its main tributaries streams being Arroyo Sarandí del Arapey, Arroyo Cambara, Arroyo Mataojo Chico, Arroyo Mataojo Grande, Arroyo del Sauce, Arroyo Valentín Grande and the Arapey Chico River, which forms part of the border with Artigas Department and has some tributaries from that department.

See also
List of rivers of Uruguay

References
Rand McNally, The New International Atlas, 1993.
 GEOnet Names Server

External links

Rivers of Uruguay
Rivers of Salto Department
Tributaries of the Uruguay River